Dorothy Lena Young (May 3, 1907March 20, 2011) was an American entertainer who worked as a stage assistant to magician Harry Houdini from 1925 to 1926. She later became a Broadway actress as well as a touring dancer.

Career
She was selected by Houdini because she was shorter than he was.   She left the act two months prior to his death on October 31, 1926.  She appeared in the several Houdini documentaries.

After his death, Young, the daughter of a Methodist minister, appeared on Broadway in Jarnegan (1928–29), Conquest (1933), and New Faces of 1936 (1936). After leaving acting, she and her second husband, Gilbert Kiamie, toured the world as the Latin dancing team of "Dorothy and Gilbert".

She was the author of two novels loosely based on her life: Diary Without Dates and Dancing on a Dime, the latter of which was made into a feature film in 1940 by Universal Studios, as well as the booklet Touring with Houdini, published in 2003.

Personal life
Her first husband, Robert Perkins, died after 13 years of marriage.  Her second husband, Gilbert Kiamie, died in 1992.  Young, the last surviving member of Houdini's touring show, died in Tinton Falls, New Jersey, on March 20, 2011, aged 103.

See also
 List of centenarians (actors, filmmakers and entertainers)

Legacy
 The Dorothy Young Center for the Arts, housed at Drew University in Madison, New Jersey.

References

External links

2000 Interview
Transcript from PBS's "The American Experience"
100 Years of Dorothy Young
Dorothy Young's obituary

1907 births
2011 deaths
People from Mount Hope, New York
People from Tinton Falls, New Jersey
American centenarians
American female dancers
Dancers from New Jersey
American stage actresses
Actresses from New Jersey
Actresses from New York (state)
Novelists from New Jersey
Novelists from New York (state)
20th-century American actresses
20th-century American novelists
American women novelists
20th-century American women writers
American United Methodists
Women centenarians
20th-century Methodists
People from Otisville, New York